Lebanon competed at the 1976 Summer Olympics in Montreal, Quebec, Canada.

Results by event

Athletics
Men's Long Jump
 Ghassan Faddoul
 Qualification — NM (→ did not advance)

Judo
Men's Lightweight - 63kg
 David Saad
 Qualification — Pool B (→ did not advance)

References
Official Olympic Reports

Nations at the 1976 Summer Olympics
1976 Summer Olympics
1976 in Lebanese sport